Kimutai is a Name of  Kalenjin origin. It's indicates that the bearer is a boy and was born near dawn ("Mutai"). It is closely related to "Kipkoech", " Kiplimo", "Kipkorir" and "Kipyego". Its Feminine equivalent is Chemutai among the Marakwet, Keiyo, Sabaot and Kipsigis and Jemutai among the Nandi

Notable People

Benjamin Kimutai (born 1971), Kenyan marathon runner and 2002 Amsterdam Marathon winner
David Kimutai (born 1969), Kenyan race walker and 2006 African champion
David Kimutai Too (1968–2008), Kenyan politician for the Orange Democratic Movement
Dr. Albert Kimutai (born 1974), Kenyan scientist, entrepreneur, educationist and politician. Currently a senior lecturer of Microbiology at Kabianga University.  
Hellen Jemaiyo Kimutai (born 1977), Kenyan marathon runner and winner of the 2012 Rome Marathon
James Koskei Kimutai (born 1968), Kenyan marathon runner
Japheth Kimutai (born 1978), Kenyan middle-distance runner and 1998 African champion
Julius Kimutai (born 1984), Kenyan road running athlete
Kiplimo Kimutai (born 1981), Kenyan road running athlete
Marius Kimutai (born 1992), Kenyan-born Bahraini long-distance runner
Raymond Kimutai Bett (born 1984), Kenyan marathon runner and two-time winner of the Athens Classic Marathon
Remmy Kimutai Limo  (born 1971), Kenyan triple jumper and Commonwealth Games medallist
Wesley Ngetich Kimutai (1977–2008), Kenyan marathon runner and two-time winner of Grandma's Marathon

Kalenjin names